is a mecha anime series produced by
Crystal Art Studio (later renamed as Studio Nue) and Tohokushinsha and animated by Soeisha (later renamed as Nippon Sunrise).
 
It consists of 66 episodes and was originally broadcast on Fuji TV. The first 39 episodes tells the attempted invasion of the earth by Armanoid aliens, while the remaining 27 episodes, with the series retitled Zero Tester: Save the Earth! (Chikyu o Mamotte!), are about an attack by Gallos aliens.
 
According to Jonathan Clements and Helen McCarthy's The Anime Encyclopedia, it was "an early gathering of many of anime's future greats, particularly for the Gundam series".

Plot 
The first directorial work by Ryosuke Takahashi. In response to the failure of Hazedon in the previous year, the second work of Soeisha changed the project content from marine adventure to science fiction.

"Thunderbird was a Japanese copyright's" Tohokushinsha planning as a concept of "Japanese-made Thunderbird" is, was produced as the No. 2 work of creation Utsusha a subsidiary. In contrast to "Hazedon," which failed in terms of audience rating, this work succeeded in terms of audience rating.

Initially, the Zero Tester was also in a scenario that eventually led to battle in the incident investigation and rescue mission, but the battle color was strengthened by repeated route changes.

At the end of the next announcement , the line "Let's charge this channel again next week" was always included.

The mechanical design has been credited as "John Dedowa" is a fictional character, the reality is Studio Nue is a SF planning company Crystal Art Studio is a de facto predecessor, as those of the current studio bran example relationship first It is a TV animation of.

Cast  
 Akira Kamiya as Shin Fubuki
 Iemasa Kayumi as Moebius
 Kiyoshi Kawakubo as Dr. Tachibana
 Noriko Ohara as Hiroshi
 Ryūsei Nakao as Gou Araishi
 Taichirō Hirokawa as Tsutomu Kenmotsu
 Yōko Asagami as Lisa

Characters

Earth side (main characters)

Snowstorm/Blizzard Shin (吹雪 シン/ふぶき シン) 
Voice - Akira Kamiya (神谷明)

Tester No. 1, Mark 1 pilot. He is called "Fubuki" in the play but is rarely referred to by name.

Araishi/Storm Go (荒石 ゴー/あらし ゴー) 
Voice - Tomoharu Takeo (竹尾智晴) (Now known as Ryusei Nakao (中尾隆聖))

Tester No. 1, Mark 2 pilot. In the play he is called "Arashi" but is rarely referred to by name. In episode 49, it is revealed that he is from Jupiter's space colony and he lost his mother in an accident when he was a boy.

Lisa (リサ) 
Voice - Yoko Asagami (麻上洋子) (Now known as Ichiryusai Harumi (一龍斎春水))

Tester No. 1, Mark 3 female pilot.

Earth side (others)

Yang (ヤン) 
Voice - Shun Yashiro ( 八代駿)

A technician dedicated to the tester corps. He invents and develops various items used by the tester corps.

Hiroshi (ヒロシ) 
Voice - Noriko Ohara (小原乃梨子)

Son of Dr. Tachibana.

Tsutomu Kenmochi (剣持勉) 
Voice - Taichiro Hirokawa (広川太一郎)

Dr. Tachibana (タチバナ博士) 
Voice - Kiyoshi Kawakubo (川久保潔)

The best brain on earth and the chief executive officer of the tester corps.

Dr. Gao (ガオ博士) 
Voice - Kosei Tomita (富田耕生)

A friend of Dr. Tachibana. The developer of Crusher 7, the battle robot in episode 50.

Kazemaki (風巻) 
Voice - Ryoichi Tanaka (田中亮一)

A male member who was appointed as a Mark 3 pilot in place of Lisa in episode 54. Severely injured during the battle with Dragon Garros.

Ann (アン) 
Voice - Mitsuyo Tobe (戸部光代)

Appeared in episode 60. Crew of a space surveillance ship. Died in the line of duty due to an attack by Specter Garos.

Joe Kelly (ジョー・ケリー) 
Voice - Rokuro Naya (納谷六朗)

Appeared in Episode 64. Built by Kuronuma Dr. (actually Amanoido). He has enough fighting power to defeat the Zoomers alone. He carried a bomb activated by Kuronuma.

Broadcast list 

 * 1 The credit is misprinted as "Yu Yamamoto".
 * 2 You are a racer with credit.

References

External links
 

1973 anime television series debuts
1974 Japanese television series endings
Fuji TV original programming
Science fiction anime and manga
Sunrise (company)